Take a Chance is a 1937 British comedy sports film directed by Sinclair Hill and starring Claude Hulbert, Binnie Hale, and Henry Kendall. It depicts farcical events in the horse racing world.

Synopsis
The cynical Richard Carfax develops a relationship with Cicely Burton, the wife of a race horse owner, in order to get inside information on a horse named 'Take a Chance' which is considered to be the favorite in an upcoming race. Her suspicious husband hires Alastair Pallivant, an incompetent tipster and part-time detective, to tail her and swears that he will scratch the horse from the race if he uncovers evidence about Carfax and his wife. Having his own private arrangement with a betting gang, Pallivant does everything he can to prevent the favourite from running. However, he encounters the equally determined Wilhelmina Ryde, a garage owner who stands to win heavily if the favorite rides to victory.

Main cast
 Claude Hulbert as Alastair Pallivant  
 Binnie Hale as Wilhelmina Ryde  
 Henry Kendall as Archie Burton  
 Enid Stamp-Taylor as Cicely Burton  
 Gwen Farrar as Lady Meriton  
 Jack Barty as Joe Cooper  
 Harry Tate as Sergeant Tugday 
 Guy Middleton as Richard Carfax 
 Kynaston Reeves as Blinkers Grayson

Production
The film was based on a play by Walter C. Hackett. It was made at Ealing Studios by the independent production company Grosvenor Films.

References

Bibliography
 Low, Rachael. Filmmaking in 1930s Britain. George Allen & Unwin, 1985.
 Wood, Linda. British Films, 1927-1939. British Film Institute, 1986.

External links

1937 films
British sports comedy films
British black-and-white films
1930s sports comedy films
British horse racing films
Films directed by Sinclair Hill
Ealing Studios films
Films set in England
British films based on plays
1930s English-language films
1930s British films